Daghalian-e Pain (also Romanized as Daghalīān-e Pā’īn and Daghalyān Pā’īn; also known as Ashāqī Tīgalān, Dāghlīān-e Soflá, Daghliyan Sofla, Tigilan, and Tygylyak) is a village in Azghan Rural District, in the Central District of Ahar County, East Azerbaijan Province, Iran. At the 2006 census, its population was 114, in 23 families.

References 

Populated places in Ahar County